Helen Jameson (born 25 September 1963) is an English former competitive swimmer.

Swimming career
Jameson represented Great Britain at the 1980 Summer Olympics in Moscow.  She was a member of the silver-medal-winning British women's team in the 4×100-metre medley relay, swimming the backstroke leg alongside teammates Margaret Kelly, Ann Osgerby and June Croft. She also competed in the individual 100-metre backstroke and 200-metre backstroke events.

Jameson represented England in the 100 and 200 metres backstroke, at the 1982 Commonwealth Games in Brisbane, Queensland, Australia. She also won the ASA National Championship 100 metres backstroke title in 1980 and 1981.

Personal life
She is the sister of Andy Jameson.

See also
 Great Britain at the 1980 Summer Olympics
 List of Olympic medalists in swimming (women)

References

External links
British Olympic Association athlete profile

1963 births
English female swimmers
Olympic swimmers of Great Britain
Swimmers at the 1980 Summer Olympics
Olympic silver medallists for Great Britain
English Olympic medallists
Commonwealth Games competitors for England
Swimmers at the 1982 Commonwealth Games
Living people
Medalists at the 1980 Summer Olympics
Olympic silver medalists in swimming